The Astris was an upper stage developed by ERNO Raumfahrttechnik GmbH and MBB as the third stage of the Europa 1 launch vehicle. It was the German contribution to the project and only flew activated four times. The high failure rate of the three and four stage rocket meant that the project was cancelled.

On November 29, 1968, its inaugural flight, the Astris third stage exploded. On the second attempt on July 1969, the Astris engine failed to start. On the third attempt on June 11, 1970, the stage performed correctly, but the fairing failed to separate. On November 5, 1971, the Europa II launched from CSG ELA-1, had a mishap due to structural failure of the third stage. After this last failure the project was definitely cancelled.

See also
 Astris (rocket engine)
 Europa (rocket)
 Viking (rocket engine)

References

Rocket stages